Sir George Nevile Maltby Bland  (6 December 1886 – 19 August 1972) was  a British diplomat who served as Envoy Extraordinary and Minister Plenipotentiary to the Netherlands from 1938 through the war years until 1948.  He also authored or edited several legal books and articles.

Early life
Bland was born the youngest son of Francis Maltby Bland, DL, JP, and his wife Edith Richenda Bland (née Barclay).  His maternal uncle Sir George Barclay had been the British Minister in Bucharest during the First World War.  His siblings included brothers Hugh Michael and Francis Lawrence Bland, and sisters Edith Richenda ("Chenda") and Esther.  Bland was educated at Eton, and then at King's College, Cambridge, graduating with a BA degree in 1908, upgraded to MA in 1912.  He entered the Diplomatic Service in 1911.

Career
After a long spell serving as Private Secretary to various senior diplomats and then as Counsellor, Nevile Bland was knighted KCVO in the 1937 Coronation Honours.  He was appointed Envoy Extraordinary and Minister Plenipotentiary to the Netherlands in 1938, and narrowly escaped internment by the Nazis by escaping in 1940.  On his return to England, he was instrumental in creating at atmosphere of hostility toward anti-Nazi Germans who had fled Hitler through the 1930s, identifying them as dangerous “Fifth Columnists”, leading directly to their mass round-up, internment and deportation to the Dominions.

He remained with the Netherlands government in exile in England during the war, and then again in The Hague until March 1948 (his post was upgraded to Ambassador in 1942). From 1952 to 1961 he was King of Arms of the Order of St Michael and St George.

Honours
 Companion of the Order of St Michael and St George, 1927 New Year Honours
 Knight Commander of the Royal Victorian Order, 1937
 Knight Commander of the Order of St Michael and St George, 1947
 Knight Grand Cross of the Order of Orange-Nassau, 1950
 King of Arms of the Order of St Michael and St George, 1952–1961

Family
In 1919, Nevile Bland became engaged and then married Portia Ottley.  They had at least three children, of whom a baby daughter Corinna died in late 1924, and a son David was killed in action in Tunisia in 1943.  Another son, Simon, survived the Second World War and a spell of duty in British Malaya to marry and father children; he became private secretary, then equerry, to the Duke and Duchess of Gloucester and Princess Alice, Duchess of Gloucester.

See also
List of diplomats of the United Kingdom to the Netherlands

Works edited
A guide to diplomatic practice, edited by Nevile Bland

Notes and references

External links

The Papers of Sir (George) Nevile (Maltby) Bland have been deposited in 1992 and 1994 by his son Sir Simon Bland at the Churchill Archives Centre, University of Cambridge, UK.

|-

1886 births
1972 deaths
People educated at Eton College
Alumni of King's College, Cambridge
Ambassadors of the United Kingdom to the Netherlands
Knights Commander of the Order of St Michael and St George
Knights Commander of the Royal Victorian Order
Knights Grand Cross of the Order of Orange-Nassau